Bedia may refer to:

Given name
 Bedia Muvahhit (1897-1994), Turkish stage and movie actress
José Bedia Valdés (born 1959), Cuban painter

Places
 Bedia, Spain, a city in the province of Biscay, Spain
 Bedia (village), a village in the Gali Municipality of Georgia

Other uses
 Bedia (caste), a community of Bihar, northern India
 Bedia (Muslim caste), a community of Bihar, northern India
 Bedia (Pashtun tribe), a community of Bihar, northern India
 Bedia Cathedral, a medieval Georgian Orthodox cathedral